Trabert is a surname. Notable people with the surname include:

Angelika Trabert (born 1967), German physician and Paralympic equestrian
Bettina Trabert (born 1969), German chess player
Tony Trabert (1930–2021), American tennis player, writer and sports announcer

See also
 Traber